The 1998–99 Ice Hockey Superleague season was the third season of the Ice Hockey Superleague (ISL). Having reached a sponsorship deal with Sekonda, the league was now formally known as the Sekonda Ice Hockey Superleague.

Basingstoke Bison left the league and joined the British National League. The London Knights were formed and joined the ISL playing out of London Arena. The Newcastle franchise also changed their name from the Newcastle Cobras to the Newcastle Riverkings.

Losing the Daily Express sponsorship, the Express Cup was renamed the Challenge Cup. The competition was also integrated into the league fixtures with the first round of games between teams (home and away) counting towards the Challenge Cup table and the league table. The league season was therefore increased to forty-two rounds.

Benson & Hedges Cup
The Benson & Hedges Cup consisted of the teams from the ISL and the top teams from the British National League. In the 1998–99 season, sixteen teams in total were split into four groups (two ISL and two BNL) playing each team in their group once at home and once away. All sixteen teams then progressed to a challenge round of a home and away game with the winners on aggregate progressing. The quarter finals and semi finals were also home and away aggregate rounds with the final being a one off game held at Sheffield Arena.

Group A

Group B

Group C

Group D

Finals
Note: The first home team is shown first

Challenge Cup
All eight teams in the league competed in the newly renamed Challenge Cup. The first round was the first home and away meeting of each team in the league with the points counting towards both the Challenge Cup table and the league table. The top four teams progressed to the semi finals. The semi finals were home and away games with the winner on aggregate progressing to the one off final game.

First round

Semi-finals
1st place (Manchester) vs 4th place (Sheffield)
Sheffield Steelers 5–0 Manchester Storm
Manchester Storm 1–3 Sheffield Steelers (Sheffield win 8–1 on aggregate)

2nd place (Nottingham) vs 3rd place (Cardiff)
Cardiff Devils 2–3 Nottingham Panthers
Nottingham Panthers 3–3 Cardiff Devils (after overtime, Nottingham win 6–5 on aggregate)

Final
Winner A vs Winner B
Sheffield Steelers 4–0 Nottingham Panthers

League
Each team played three home games and three away games against each of their opponents. All eight teams were entered into the playoffs.

Playoffs
All eight teams in the league took part in the playoffs. Group A consisted of Bracknell, London, Manchester and Sheffield while Group B consisted of Ayr, Cardiff, Newcastle and Nottingham. The top two teams from each playoff group qualified for the finals weekend. The third place playoff was dropped for this season.

Group A

Group B

Semi-finals
Winner A vs Runner-Up B
Manchester Storm 0-4 Cardiff Devils

Winner B vs Runner-Up A
Nottingham Panthers 4–3 Bracknell Bees

Final
Winner A vs Winner B
Cardiff Devils 2-1 Nottingham Panthers

Awards
Coach of the Year Trophy – Kurt Kleinendorst, Manchester Storm
Player of the Year Trophy – Frank Pietrangelo, Manchester Storm
Ice Hockey Annual Trophy – Tony Hand, Sheffield Steelers
British Netminder of the Year – Stevie Lyle, Cardiff Devils
Alan Weeks Trophy – Stephen Cooper, Newcastle Riverkings

All Star teams

Scoring leaders
The scoring leaders are taken from all league games.

Most points: 56 Paul Adey (Nottingham Panthers)
Most goals: 29 Greg Hadden (Nottingham Panthers)
Most assists: 35 Paul Adey (Nottingham Panthers)
Most PIMs: 152 Paxton Schulte (Bracknell Bees)

References
Ice Hockey Journalists UK
The Internet Hockey Database
Malcolm Preen's Ice Hockey Results and Tables

Ice Hockey Superleague seasons
1
United